CDE Escuela de Baloncesto Alcarreña is a basketball team based in Guadalajara, Spain that currently plays in Primera División, fifth tier.

History
The club was founded in 2011 with the aim to substitute dissolved CB Guadalajara. In August 2012, the team achivied one of the vacant berths in LEB Plata.

In its first season, CEBA Guadalajara was the champion of the Copa LEB Plata after beating Unión Financiera Asturiana Oviedo Baloncesto by 78–71.

In July 2015, the club saw no forthcoming support so decided to resign its self to the spot in LEB Plata and to play in the fifth tier.

Season by season

Trophies and awards

Trophies
Copa LEB Plata: (1)
2013

References

External links
Official website

Basketball teams in Castilla–La Mancha
Former LEB Plata teams
Sport in Guadalajara, Spain